USS Charles P. Kuper (SP-1235) was a United States Navy tug in service from 1917 to 1919.

Charles P. Kuper was built as the commercial tug C. Offerman in 1892 by Browne at Tottenville on Staten Island, New York. On 29 November 1906, she was sold to the Simmons Lighterage Company of New York City, which renamed her Charles P. Kuper.

In August 1917, the U.S. Navy chartered Charles P. Kuper from her owner, the Simmons Transportation Company of New York City for use during World War I. She entered service as USS Charles P. Kuper (SP-1235) in 1917.

Assigned to the 3rd Naval District and based at New York City, Charles P. Kuper served in New York Harbor under the control of the Supply Department for the rest of World War I and into 1919.

The Navy returned Charles P. Kuper to Simmons Transportation on 21 July 1919.

Notes

References
 
 Department of the Navy Naval History and Heritage Command Online Library of Selected Images: U.S. Navy Ships: Charles P. Kuper (American Harbor Tug, 1892). Previously named C. Offerman. Served as USS Charles P. Kuper (SP-1235) in 1917-1919
 NavSource Online: Section Patrol Craft Photo Archive Charles P. Kuper (SP 1235)

Tugs of the United States Navy
World War I auxiliary ships of the United States
Ships built in Staten Island
1892 ships